"Dumb & Dumber" is the first Japanese song by South Korean boy group iKon. The single was released by YGEX on September 9, 2016. The single has three B-side songs, "#WYD" and "Sinosijak (Remix)" with a new song "Love Me".

Commercial performance 
The song debuted at number one on Japan's official chart Oricon Singles Chart with 48,749 physical copies sold in the first week, while on Billboard Japan, the song debuted also at number one on Japan Hot 100 and Hot Single Sales with total 114,653 on the first week.

In Oricon singles year end chart, the song charted in No.93 selling 60,887.

Track listings and formats

Charts

Certifications

Release history

References

External links

2016 singles
2016 songs
Billboard Japan Hot 100 number-one singles
Japanese-language songs
Oricon Weekly number-one singles
IKon songs
YG Entertainment singles